Frederick (Fred) Michael Boimistruck, Jr. (born January 14, 1962) is a Canadian retired ice hockey defenceman. He played in the NHL for the Toronto Maple Leafs.

Born in Sudbury, Ontario, Boimistruck grew up in Capreol, Ontario. He played junior ice hockey for the Cornwall Royals, playing twice for the Memorial Cup. He was selected by the Maple Leafs in the 1980 NHL Draft, 43rd overall. He joined the Maple Leafs directly from junior, playing 57 games for Toronto, scoring two goals and eleven assists. The following season, Boimistruck played part of the season with Toronto, but mostly with their farm team in St. Catharines. After one further season at St. Catharines, Boimistruck tried playing in Europe, played some games for Fort Wayne and finished his playing career in 1985–86 with the Flint Spirits. After his playing days, Boimistruck moved to Hornepayne, Ontario and became a locomotive engineer.

Career statistics

Awards
 QMJHL First All-Star Team 1980–81
 Emile Bouchard Trophy, 1980–81

References

External links

Canadian ice hockey defencemen
Cornwall Royals (QMJHL) players
Flint Spirits players
Fort Wayne Komets players
Ice hockey people from Ontario
Sportspeople from Greater Sudbury
St. Catharines Saints players
SC Langnau players
Toronto Maple Leafs draft picks
Toronto Maple Leafs players
1962 births
Living people